Jacob Aligo is a South Sudanese politician. He has served as Minister of Finance & Economic Development of Central Equatoria since 2005.

References

South Sudanese politicians
Living people
Year of birth missing (living people)
People from Central Equatoria
Place of birth missing (living people)